Nikolai Stepanovich Kurochkin (Николай Степанович Курочкин, 4 June 1830, Saint Petersburg, Russian Empire, — 14 December 1884, Saint Petersburg, Russian Empire) was a Russian poet, editor, translator (Arsène Houssaye novels, Italian poetry) and essayist. Writing under numerous pseudonyms (Preobrazhensky, Chereret, etc.), Kurochkin published both satirical poems and serious essays (including Letters from Paris and Milan, in 1874-1876) mostly in Otechestvennye Zapiski, of which since 1868 he was a major contributor, and Iskra, the magazine he co-edited. In 1865-1867 he edited the magazine Knizhny Vestnik. Vasily and Vladimir Kurochkins were his brothers.

References

External links
 

1830 births
1884 deaths
Poets from the Russian Empire
Male writers from the Russian Empire
Editors from the Russian Empire
Writers from Saint Petersburg
Translators from the Russian Empire
S.M. Kirov Military Medical Academy alumni
19th-century translators from the Russian Empire
19th-century male writers from the Russian Empire